Julian Hartridge (September 9, 1829 – January 8, 1879) was an American politician.

Early years and education
Hartridge was born in Savannah, Georgia on September 9, 1829, where attended Chatham Academy and Montpelier Institute. Hartridge graduated from Brown University in 1848 and Harvard Law School in 1850. He was admitted to the bar in 1851 and practiced law in Savannah, Georgia. He served as the Solicitor of the Eastern District of Georgia from 1854 to 1858.

Political career
Hartridge was a member of the Georgia House of Representatives 1858 to 1859. He represented the state in the First Confederate Congress and the Second Confederate Congress. During the Civil War Hartridge served one year in the Confederate Army as a lieutenant in the Chatham Artillery. After the war he returned to politics, and was elected as a Democrat to the Forty-fourth Congress and the Forty-fifth Congress, serving from 1875 until his death in Washington, D.C. in 1879.

Death and legacy
In an article printed in the New York Times, after his death, it was reported that Representative Hartridge was much admired by colleagues on both sides of the aisle. The funeral for Rep. Hartridge was attended by the President, Cabinet members, Justices of the Supreme Court and other dignitaries. Hartridge was buried in Laurel Grove Cemetery in Savannah. The French-speaking American author Julien Green was his grandson.

See also
List of United States Congress members who died in office (1790–1899)

References

External links

Julian Hartridge at Political Graveyard

1829 births
1879 deaths
Georgia (U.S. state) lawyers
Democratic Party members of the Georgia House of Representatives
Brown University alumni
Harvard Law School alumni
Members of the Confederate House of Representatives from Georgia (U.S. state)
Democratic Party members of the United States House of Representatives from Georgia (U.S. state)
19th-century American politicians
19th-century American lawyers